Dendrophryniscus is a genus of true toads in the family Bufonidae, sometimes known as tree toads. They are endemic to the Atlantic Forest of Brazil.

Taxonomy
Until 2012, the genus Dendrophryniscus included the species now separated to the genus Amazophrynella. This was based on molecular genetic evidence that indicated deep divergence between an Amazonian and an Atlantic Forest clade, the latter retaining the name Dendrophryniscus whereas the former was described as a new genus Amazonella, later amended to Amazophrynella because of homonymy.

Description
Their body form resembles those of the genus Atelopus. The hind limbs are well developed. The parotoid glands are absent, as are external tympana. The skin is uniformly granulose to warty. Dorsal coloration is cryptic.

With the exception of Dendrophryniscus leucomystax, species of the genus Dendrophryniscus breed in phytotelmata. In contrast, species of the genus Amazophrynella are pond breeders, which is presumably an ancestral trait in bufonids.

Species
The following species are recognized in the genus Dendrophryniscus:

References

 
Amphibians of South America
Endemic fauna of Brazil
Taxa named by Marcos Jiménez de la Espada
Amphibian genera